Zoran Pavlović (born 27 June 1976) is a former Slovenian footballer who played as a midfielder.

Club career
Although he was born in Tuzla, Pavlović's family moved to Velenje when he was young. He started his career at Rudar Velenje, making his first appearance in the Slovenian PrvaLiga during the 1994–95 season. Later, he played with Dinamo Zagreb, Austria Wien, Vorskla Poltava, Olimpija, Nafta Lendava, and Interblock.
In the 2008–09 season, he played for and captained Maribor. After a string of poor results and a dispute with fans, he left the club in October 2009. He later signed on a combined player-sporting director contract with Drava Ptuj. He left the club in April 2010, allegedly due to a conflict surrounding the sacking of manager Milko Djurovski whom he had brought to the club only months before. In January 2012, he signed a contract as a player for Styrian amateur team SV Schwanberg.

International career

Pavlović played 21 matches for the Slovenia national team and was a participant at the Euro 2000 and the 2002 FIFA World Cup.

Honours

Rudar Velenje

Slovenian Football Cup: 1997–98

Dinamo Zagreb

Prva HNL: 1999–2000
Croatian Cup: 2001

Maribor

Slovenian PrvaLiga: 2008–09
Slovenian Supercup: 2009

References

External links

 
 Player profile at NZS 

1976 births
Living people
Sportspeople from Tuzla
Slovenian footballers
Slovenia under-21 international footballers
Slovenia international footballers
Association football midfielders
Slovenian expatriate footballers
Slovenian people of Bosnia and Herzegovina descent
NK Rudar Velenje players
GNK Dinamo Zagreb players
FK Austria Wien players
FC Red Bull Salzburg players
FC Vorskla Poltava players
ŠK Slovan Bratislava players
SFC Opava players
NK Olimpija Ljubljana (1945–2005) players
FC Rot-Weiß Erfurt players
NK Nafta Lendava players
NK IB 1975 Ljubljana players
NK Maribor players
NK Drava Ptuj players
NK Celje players
NK Šmartno 1928 players
Slovenian expatriate sportspeople in Croatia
Slovenian expatriate sportspeople in Austria
Slovenian expatriate sportspeople in Ukraine
Slovenian expatriate sportspeople in Slovakia
Slovenian expatriate sportspeople in the Czech Republic
Slovenian expatriate sportspeople in Germany
Expatriate footballers in Croatia
Expatriate footballers in Austria
Expatriate footballers in Ukraine
Expatriate footballers in Slovakia
Expatriate footballers in the Czech Republic
Expatriate footballers in Germany
Slovenian PrvaLiga players
Croatian Football League players
Austrian Football Bundesliga players
Ukrainian Premier League players
Slovak Super Liga players
Czech First League players
2. Bundesliga players
UEFA Euro 2000 players
2002 FIFA World Cup players